The Pelota Fronton is a Basque pelota ball court and landmark in Jordan Valley, Oregon, United States. The court was built in 1915 and finished in 1917. It was last used regularly in 1935. This was caused by the Taylor Grazing Act of 1934. Jordan Valley had numerous Basque immigrants that came to herd sheep. After the act passed, the court gradually lost usage, and it started falling into disrepair over a span of roughly 4 decades. In 1972, the court was listed on the National Register of Historic Places. 

In 1997, the court underwent a full renovation. Restoration included installation of a covered interpretive sign and a stone representation of the Zazpiak Bat, the coat of arms for the seven Basque provinces. A sign reads: “Jordan Valley Ko Frontoia restored 1997 danok etorri” in recognition of the inauguration of the restored pelota fronton in September 1997.

In Jordan Valley games, the wicker racket, or cesta, is not used. To this day, the court remains a symbol of Basque culture in the region.

See also
 Basque diaspora
 Basque rural sports
 National Register of Historic Places listings in Malheur County, Oregon

References

External links

1915 establishments in Oregon
Basque-American culture in Oregon
Basque pelota in the United States
Buildings and structures in Malheur County, Oregon
Fronton (court)
National Register of Historic Places in Malheur County, Oregon